Arthur Taylor House may refer to:

 Arthur Taylor House (Paris, Idaho), listed on the NRHP in Idaho
 Arthur Taylor House (Moab, Utah), listed on the NRHP in Utah